Batman Beyond: Return of the Joker (also known as Batman of the Future: Return of the Joker outside of the United States, The Return of the Joker, Batman Beyond: The Movie or The Batman Beyond Movie in the working title) is a 2000 American direct-to-video animated superhero film produced by Warner Bros. Animation and distributed by Warner Bros. Home Entertainment. It is the third film in the DC Animated Universe and is based on the animated series Batman Beyond while also serving as a continuation of and resolving plot points from The New Batman Adventures. The film features the DC Comics superheroes Bruce Wayne (Kevin Conroy) and Terry McGinnis (Will Friedle), as they try to unravel the mysterious return of the former's archenemy, the Joker (Mark Hamill). 

Following the Columbine High School massacre, the film received heavy edits that delayed its release from a Halloween 2000 to December 12, 2000, with an uncut version subsequently being released on DVD in 2002. The film takes place during the third and final season of Batman Beyond.

Plot
A new faction of the Jokerz gang—consisting of Bonk, Woof, Ghoul, Chucko and the Dee-Dee twins—attempts to steal high-tech electronic equipment, but they are intercepted by Batman (Terry McGinnis), the protégé of Bruce Wayne. The gang reports back to their leader, revealed to be the Joker, who was Bruce's nemesis and has mysteriously reappeared in Gotham following his presumed death years ago. The Joker kills Bonk for defiance and to intimidate the other members.

Later, the Jokerz attack a press conference commemorating Bruce's return to Wayne Enterprises and the Joker reveals himself to Bruce, who insists that it cannot be him despite evidence to the contrary. After fending off the attack, Terry demands information from Bruce and Gotham City Police Department's Commissioner Barbara Gordon, the former Batgirl, but neither gives him answers. Eventually, Bruce orders Terry to return the Batsuit so he can investigate and confront the Joker on his own despite the limitations of his age. However, the Jokerz attack Terry, nearly killing his girlfriend Dana Tan, while the Joker poisons Bruce and his Great Dane, Ace—revealing he knows Bruce was Batman and that Terry is his successor.

After Terry saves Bruce's life with an antidote, Barbara finally explains the Joker's disappearance albeit reluctantly; Four decades ago, sometime following Dick Grayson's departure from Gotham City to Blüdhaven, the Joker and Harley Quinn kidnapped his successor Tim Drake, then Robin, while he was on patrol, inflicting three weeks of torture and brainwashing on him at the abandoned Arkham Asylum to learn Batman's secrets. When Batman and Batgirl found Tim, he was altered by the Joker's chemicals to match him, albeit as a miniature version. A fight ensued, during which Tim turned on and killed the Joker, suffering a complete nervous breakdown, while Harley fell down a ravine and was presumed dead. After he recovered a year later with help from Wayne family friend, Dr. Leslie Thompkins, Tim was forced into retirement by Bruce who blamed himself for the whole ordeal, severing his ties with the latter and left to make it on his own in life.

Terry visits Tim, who voices bitterness towards his past as Robin but denies any involvement in the Joker's return. Terry's next suspect is Jordan Pryce, a Wayne Enterprises executive who hates Bruce for ruining his chance to take over Wayne Enterprises, but he only finds Pryce guilty of conspiring with the Jokerz to have Bruce killed. When the beam of a directed-energy weapon strikes Pryce's yacht from above, Terry rescues Pryce before turning him in to the police. In the Batcave, after realizing the Joker only destroyed the Robin costume, Terry recalls Tim's grudge against his old persona and deduces he must be involved; cross-referencing Tim's expertise as a telecommunications engineer with the Jokerz' thefts, Terry and Bruce discover the stolen equipment can create a jamming system to seize control of a laser-armed military satellite.

When Terry goes to face Tim, he triggers a trap set by the Joker, who he then follows to an abandoned candy factory after surviving further attacks from the satellite. Subduing the Jokerz with Ace's help, Terry confronts the Joker, who gloats he encoded himself into a microchip built with genetic technology hidden behind Tim's ear—allowing him to survive his death by turning Tim into the Joker's host, who is on the verge of completely taking over Tim. With the satellite, the Joker plans to kill Bruce and Terry's loved ones before destroying Gotham City. As they battle, Terry uses one of the Joker's joy buzzers to destroy both the weapon and the microchip, saving the city and freeing Tim as the Joker finally meets his end.

Following the Jokerz' arrests, Barbara hides Tim's unwitting involvement to protect him with the Joker declared dead in the factory's explosion, while the Dee-Dee twins are bailed out by their grandmother—an elderly Harley Quinn, who survived her fall and reformed. Bruce makes amends with Tim and Barbara while Tim recovers in the hospital, during which Bruce and Tim acknowledge Terry as worthy to carry the mantle of the Bat.

Voice cast

 Will Friedle as Terry McGinnis / Batman
 Kevin Conroy as Bruce Wayne / Batman
 Mark Hamill as Joker & Jordan Pryce
 Angie Harmon as Commissioner Barbara Gordon
 Tara Strong as Young Barbara Gordon / Batgirl
 Dean Stockwell as Tim Drake
 Mathew Valencia as  Young Tim Drake / Robin
 Andrea Romano as Joker Jr. / J.J (credited as "Laughing Boy")
 Arleen Sorkin as Harleen Quinzel / Harley Quinn & Amy
 Melissa Joan Hart as Delia and Deidre Dennis / Dee Dee
 Michael Rosenbaum as Stewart Carter Winthrop III / Ghoul
 Don Patrick Harvey as Charles Buntz / Chucko
 Henry Rollins as Benjamin Knox / Bonk
 Frank Welker as Woof the Hyena-Man / Ace the Bat-Hound
 Lauren Tom as Dana Tan
 Rachael Leigh Cook as Chelsea Cunningham
 Teri Garr as Mary McGinnis
 Ryan O'Donohue as Matthew "Matt" McGinnis
 Vernee Watson-Johnson as Ms. Joyce Carr
 Mary Scheer as Mrs. Drake
 Jason Stanford as a Gangster

Production 

The film was initially put into production after the cancellation of Boyd Kirkland's Batman: Arkham, the intended sequel to Batman & Mr. Freeze: SubZero. When Bruce Timm and Glen Murakami were given the green-light to produce a Batman Beyond feature-length film, they decided to use the extra time to answer questions pertaining to the time period between Beyond and the rest of the DC Animated Universe. 

Will Friedle, Kevin Conroy, and Mark Hamill reprised their roles as Terry McGinnis, Bruce Wayne, and the Joker, respectively, while Dean Stockwell and Angie Harmon joined the voice cast as Tim Drake and Barbara Gordon respectively while Mathew Valencia and Tara Strong reprised their younger versions from The New Batman Adventures. Arleen Sorkin returned as Harley Quinn, a role she originated in Batman: The Animated Series.

The animation was outsourced to TMS Entertainment in Japan, however, Timm and his crew also used TMS as an outsourced pre-production unit, as a result, TMS also storyboarded almost half of the film in addition to doing the animation. It is also the first Batman direct-to-video animated film to use digital ink and paint.

Dwayne McDuffie, writer for Static Shock, Justice League ad Justice League Unlimited  has stated that the events of the flashback sequence in the film take place at the end of the present-day timeline of the DCAU, following the end of Justice League Unlimited but prior to the start of Batman Beyond.

Release 
Return of the Joker was originally set for release on Halloween 2000, but, following the backlash against violence in children's media that resulted from the Columbine High School massacre in April 1999, the creative team was forced to make edits that delayed the film's release until December 12, 2000. 

The most dramatic change was the method of the Joker's death: rather than being shot and killed by Tim Drake, he is instead electrocuted after becoming tangled in water tubing. Two years after the film's initial release, and following online petitions, Warner Home Video released an uncut and unaltered version of Return of the Joker, with more violence and some altered language, as well as the Joker's original death scene. 

While the 2000 release was not rated, the uncut version was the first animated Batman film to receive a PG-13 rating from the Motion Picture Association.

Marketing 
A comic adaptation of the film was released in February 2001, drawn by Craig Rousseau. The page depicting the Joker's death had to be redone in accordance with the edits made to the film. A tie-in video game was released in 2000 for Game Boy Color, PlayStation, and Nintendo 64. Scholastic released a novelization of the film, penned by Michael Teitelbaum, on October 1, 2000.

Music

Released on October 17, 2000, the soundtrack to Batman Beyond: Return of the Joker contains music composed by Kristopher Carter, as well as two tracks of music featured in the direct-to-video film.

Critical reception 
On Rotten Tomatoes, 100% of critics gave the film a positive review based on 10 reviews, with an average rating of 8/10. The site's critics consensus reads, "This feature length entry in the Batman Beyond mythos sends off the Mark Hamill-voiced Joker in thrilling fashion, hitting the same caped crusading peaks of the original series."

Nisha Gopalan of Entertainment Weekly praised the uncut version of the film, in particular how it "sheds light on the dark, obsessive relationship between the villain and his vigilante counterpart." Gerry Shamray of Sun Newspapers said that Return of the Joker "would have made a great live-action Batman movie." Ryan Cracknell of Apollo Guide called the film "an animated masterpiece."

Peter Canavese of Groucho Reviews called it an "energetic and unsettling Batman adventure," adding that it "provides a memorable showcase for Hamill's celebrated take on the Joker, and allows both McGinnis and Wayne to see action and face emotional challenges." Michael Stailey of DVD Verdict gave the uncut version a score of 92 out of 100, calling it "a taut, high-impact film" and "a must-buy to Bat-fans and animation lovers alike."

Garth Franklin of Dark Horizons had a mixed response when reviewing the uncut version, saying that "the script is pretty solid, the animation superb, and the voice performances all work well," but added that "the Terry character's personal scenes aren't anywhere near as engaging [as the scenes featuring the Joker or Bruce Wayne], and the investigative subplot doesn't work as well as it should." Jeremy Conrad of IGN gave the uncut version a score of nine out of 10 for the movie itself, six out of 10 each for video and audio, and eight out of 10 for extras, adding up to an overall score of seven out of 10.

Accolades

References

External links 

DC page

Batman NOT Beyond The Censor's Reach —detailed analysis of the last-minute changes
Batman Beyond: Return of the Joker Edit List—The World's Finest's list of cuts and edits, includes screencaps from both versions.
Batman Beyond: Return Of The Joker @ BYTB: Batman Yesterday, Today and Beyond

2000 animated films
2000 films
2000 action films
2000s American animated films
2000 direct-to-video films
2000s animated superhero films
Adult animated superhero films
Animated action films
Animated Batman films
Return of the Joker
DC Animated Universe films
Direct-to-video animated films based on DC Comics
Direct-to-video sequel films
Films about child abuse
Films about child abduction in the United States
Films about consciousness transfer
Films about terrorism
Films set in 2005
Films set in 2040
Films set in the future
Films about genetic engineering
Fiction about mind control
Films directed by Curt Geda
Films with screenplays by Paul Dini
Films adapted into comics
Film controversies
Political controversies in film
American adult animated films
Censored films
2000s English-language films